This is the discography of Dragon, a popular rock band formed in Auckland, New Zealand, in January 1972, who relocated to Sydney, Australia in May 1975. They were previously led by singer Marc Hunter, and are currently led by his brother, bass player Todd Hunter. They performed and released material under the name Hunter in Europe and United States during 1987.

Albums

Studio albums

Live albums

Compilation albums

Extended plays

Singles

References

External links
Dragon Online: Official website

Dragon (band)
Rock music group discographies
Pop music group discographies